Frank Gill may refer to:

Frank Gill (Australian footballer) (1908–1970), Australian rules footballer with Carlton
Frank Gill (footballer, born 1948), footballer for Tranmere Rovers
Frank Gill (politician) (1917–1982), New Zealand politician
Frank Gill (ornithologist) (born 1941), American ornithologist
Frank Gill (engineer) (1866–1950), British telephony engineer